Photon Paint is a Hold-And-Modify (HAM) based bitmap graphics editor for the  Amiga, first released in 1987. Photon Paint was the first bitmap graphics editor to incorporate 3D solid modeling and texture mapping as an integral part of the program.

Photon Paint was programmed by Oren Peli, Eyal Ofek, and Amir Zbeda at Bazbosoft, an Israeli software house. It was published by MicroIllusions of the US and distributed all over the world. 

The program sold some 250,000 units and received a best of breed award from Amiga World magazine.

Release history
The original Photon Paint was released in 1987
Photon Paint v2.0 was released in 1988
A Macintosh version was also released in 1988

See also

Deluxe Paint, the most popular paint program for the Amiga
Brilliance, a well-regarded rival to Deluxe Paint IV and V
List of raster graphics editors
Comparison of raster graphics editors

References

Notes
 
 

1987 software
Raster graphics editors
Amiga software
Classic Mac OS software